Annetta is a Latinate variant of the feminine given name Anna. It is used in Italian-speaking countries. Notable people with the name include:

Annetta R. Chipp (1866-1961), American temperance leader and prison evangelist
Annetta Grodner, Ukrainian singer, actress and Yiddish theatre performer
Annetta Kapon, Greek artist
Annetta Johnson Saint-Gaudens (1869–1943), American sculptor
Annetta Schwartz, Yiddish theatre performer

Italian feminine given names